Hafrún Rakel Halldórsdóttir (born 1 October 2002) is an Icelandic footballer who plays as a midfielder for Breiðablik and the Iceland national team.

Club career
After coming up through the junior teams of Afturelding, Hafrún started her senior team career with the joint team of Afturelding/Fram in the 2. deild kvenna. After being pursued by several clubs, she joined Úrvalsdeild kvenna club Breiðablik in end of September 2019 after her contract expired with Afturelding expired.

National team career
Hafrún Rakel was selected to the Icelandic national team for the first time in March 2021. She made her debut against Italy on 10 April the same year.

References

External links

2002 births
Living people
Women's association football midfielders
Hafrún Rakel Halldórsdóttir
Hafrún Rakel Halldórsdóttir
Breiðablik women's football players
Úrvalsdeild kvenna (football) players